SARS most commonly refers to severe acute respiratory syndrome, a viral respiratory disease identified in the early 2000s caused by SARS-CoV-1.

SARS or Sars may also refer to:

Biology and medicine
 SARS (gene), a human gene for encoding the enzyme cytoplasmic seryl-tRNA synthetase
 Severe acute respiratory syndrome–related coronavirus (SARSr-CoV or SARS-CoV), a virus species containing:
 Severe acute respiratory syndrome coronavirus (SARS-CoV or SARS-CoV-1), the virus that causes:
Severe acute respiratory syndrome, an infectious disease first identified in 2002
 Severe acute respiratory syndrome coronavirus 2 (SARS-CoV-2), the virus that causes:
 Coronavirus disease 2019 (COVID-19), an infectious disease first identified in 2019
 Bat SARS-like coronavirus WIV1 (Bat SL-CoV-WIV1 or SARS-like coronavirus WIV1), a strain isolated from Chinese rufous horseshoe bats

Organizations
 South African Revenue Service
 Special Anti-Robbery Squad, former unit of the Nigeria Police Force
 End SARS, decentralised protest movement aimed at disbanding the squad
 Suffolk Accident Rescue Service, a charity providing medical care in the United Kingdom

Places
 Sars (urban-type settlement), a settlement in Perm Krai, Russia
 Sars Bank, a bank in the Drake Passage between South America and Antarctica

France
 Le Sars, a commune in Pas-de-Calais
 Sars-le-Bois, a commune in Pas-de-Calais
 Sars-Poteries, a commune in Nord
 Sars-et-Rosières, a commune in Nord

Other uses
 SARS (band) (Sveže Amputirana Ruka Satrijanija), a Serbian alternative rock band
 Sarah D. Bunting or Sars, American blogger and journalist
 Sarsfields GAA (Cork) or Sars, a hurling club in Ireland

People with the surname
 Alain Sars (born 1961), French football referee
 Ernst Sars (1835–1917), Norwegian historian, son of Michael Sars
 Eva Sars (1858–1907), later Eva Nansen, Norwegian singer and skier, daughter of Michael Sars, wife of Fridtjof Nansen
 Georg Ossian Sars (1837–1927), Norwegian biologist, son of Michael Sars
 Maren Sars (1811–1898) née Welhaven, Norwegian socialite and wife of Michael Sars
 Michael Sars (1805–1869), Norwegian biologist and priest

See also

 SAR (disambiguation)
 Sarsaparilla (soft drink) or sarsi